Chaudhry Zahoor Elahi (1917 – 25 September 1981) was a Pakistani politician who rose to prominence from a small town of Gujrat, Punjab, Pakistan.

Chaudhry Zahoor Elahi began his career in the police force as a constable but gave it up soon after the creation of Pakistan and ventured into business in association with his elder brother Ch Manzoor Elahi, who was a textile engineer by profession. The two brothers jointly purchased and operated a textile mill after independence of Pakistan in Gujrat. Chaudhry Zahoor Elahi was a Jat of the Warriach clan.

He entered local politics in the 1950s. During Ayub Khan's rule. During this period, the governor of West Pakistan, Nawab of Kalabagh Amir Mohammad Khan, was opponent of Chaudhry Zahoor Elahi. As the Secretary-General of the Convention Muslim League, he came to oppose Zulfikar Ali Bhutto. In his conflict with Bhutto, Chaudhry Zahoor Elahi was imprisoned and his family property was confiscated by the Government. Chaudhry Zahoor Elahi was assassinated in Lahore in 1981 by al-Zulfikar, a terrorist organisation led by Murtaza Bhutto, who claimed responsibility for the attack.

Early life
Chaudhry Zahoor Elahi's father was Chaudhry Sardar Khan Warraich. Chaudhry Manzoor Elahi, father of Chaudhry Parvez Elahi is the elder brother of Chaudhry Zahoor Elahi. He was raised in Gujrat but left his hometown in 1939 to pursue further studies. He received his degree in textile engineering from Amritsar in 1940.

Business
Upon his return from Amritsar, Chaudry Manzoor Elahi teamed with Chaudhry Zahoor Elahi to develop a family owned textile business in Gujrat. After independence in 1947, the two brothers established two textile units under the names of Gujrat Silk Mills and Pakistan Textile Mills. In 1950, the business was expanded to Lahore where they established Parvez Textile Mills, specializing in weaving, finishing and dyeing. In 1951–52, Chaudhry Manzoor Elahi went to Japan to import textile machinery for Gujrat and Lahore units. Armed with his textile education and business skills, Chaudry Manzoor Elahi's textile units continued to flourish under his leadership. The family continued to dedicate their energies to their business and set up Modern Flour Mills in Lahore and Rawalpindi.

Early political career
In 1956, Chaudry Zahoor Elahi decided to enter politics while Chaudhry Manzoor Elahi was running family business. Chaudhry Zahoor Elahi was elected Chairman of the Gujrat District Board in 1958. Same year, Chaudhry Zahoor Elahi was also elected as a Director of the National Bank of Pakistan. He kept returning to the National Bank board of directors for the next twelve years.

In 1958, General Ayub Khan imposed martial law. He enforced the Elected Bodies Disqualification Order (EBDO) which was used to disqualify politicians for next five years. The politicians facing EBDO were given two options; they were either to retire voluntarily from politics or to face Government's punitive action. Chaudhry Zahoor Elahi was the only politician, who challenged the draconian EBDO ordinance. Despite being cleared by the EBDO Tribunal of all charges, Chaudhry Zahoor Elahi was victimized by the Martial Law regime and was sentenced to six months imprisonment. Despite this, Chaudhry Zahoor Elahi was elected Member of the National Assembly in 1962 and he consequently became Secretary General of the Pakistan Muslim League's Parliamentary Party of United Pakistan. Around this time the family also purchased Pakistan Times, English daily published from West Pakistan.

1970s
He was elected to the National Assembly in 1970. He was among the few members of the Pakistan Muslim League to get elected. Followed by the fall of East Pakistan in 1971 Mr. Z. A Bhutto emerged as the new ruler of the remaining Pakistan. On his coming to power, Z.A. Bhutto nationalized all major industries including flour mills. Chaudhry Zahoor Elahi was among the nine opposition parliamentary leaders who were forcibly thrown out of the Parliament House on Bhutto's orders. From ludicrous and politically motivated police cases such as the alleged buffalo theft case to the farfetched case of supply of Iraqi arms for rebellion in Balochistan, he was constantly targeted and implicated in several fabricated cases during Bhutto rule.

But this could not silence Chaudhry Zahoor Elahi's. He was arrested for delivering an anti-government speech in Hotel Inter Continental, Karachi and a special tribunal sentenced him to imprisonment for five years. He remained imprisoned in different jails but mostly remained at the Karachi jail.

The Pakistan National Alliance (PNA) gained momentum following 1977. All top PNA leaders including Chaudhry Zahoor Elahi were arrested. Chaudhry Zahoor Elahi and others were released when General Zia ul Haq's army took over on July 5, 1977. General Zia ul Haq immediately announced holding of fresh elections within 90 days. Chaudhry Zahoor Elahi filed his nomination papers from Gujrat and Constituency No.3 of Lahore from where Z. A. Bhutto had also declared to contest. However, these elections were postponed when General Mohammad Zia ul Haq arrested Bhutto. Due to the deteriorating financial plight of the nationalized industries, Zia government decided to return them to their original owners. The Chaudhry family took charge of their previously nationalised flourmills.

1980s
Following General Zia's actions against the Bhutto family, Murtaza Bhutto formed Al – Zulfiqar. Ghulam Mustafa Khar, who was living in exile in London informed a close associate of Chauhdry Zahoor Elahi of Al-Zulfiqar's plot to assassinate Chaudhry Zahoor Elahi. Tragically, Chaudhry Zahoor Elahi became the first victim of Al – Zulfiqar when he was assassinated in Lahore in September 1981. Murtaza Bhutto publicly accepted responsibility for the assassination in his interview with BBC.

At this juncture, the Chaudhry family decided that Chaudhry Shujat Hussain and Chaudhry Parvez Elahi (sons of Chaudhry Zahoor Elahi and Chaudhry Manzoor Elahi) should take charge of the family business as well as enter politics.

Family

Chaudhry Shujaat Hussain, son, former Prime Minister of Pakistan in 2004
Chaudhry Wajahat Hussain, son
Chaudhry Shafaat Hussain, son
Chaudhry Pervaiz Elahi, Son in law and nephew, Former Chief Minister of Punjab (Pakistan) from 2002 to 2007, First Deputy Prime Minister of Pakistan from 2012 to 2013
Moonis Elahi, (MNA) grandson s/o Chaudhry Pervaiz Ellahi
Hussain Elahi (MNA) grandson s/o Chaudhry Wajahat hussain
Mussa Elahi grandson s/o Chaudhry Wajahat hussain
Salik Hussain (MNA ) grandson s/o Chaudhry Shujhaat hussain

References

External links
Recent changes in Delhi and Islamabad have not been dissimilar – The Telegraph, Calcutta, India

1981 deaths
Chaudhry family
Politicians from Gujrat, Pakistan
Punjabi people
Assassinated Pakistani politicians
1921 births